Sērmūkši Manor was a manor house in Cēsis Municipality in the Vidzeme region of Latvia. It was burned down in 1905 and never rebuilt.

History 
A new structure for the Sērmūkši school was built in 1936 on the site of the former manor house.

See also
List of palaces and manor houses in Latvia

References

Manor houses in Latvia
Cēsis Municipality
Vidzeme